Glis is a genus of rodent that contains two extant species, both known as edible dormice or fat dormice: the European edible dormouse (Glis glis) and the Iranian edible dormouse (Glis persicus). It also contains a number of fossil species.

Evolution
The genus Glis originated in the mid-Oligocene. It did not become common until the Pliocene. Only one species, Glis sackdillingensis is known to have survived into the Pleistocene. This is probably likely the ancestor of the modern species, which appeared in the early to mid-Pleistocene. 

One former species, Glis truyolsi, has been placed in the genus Myoglis and it has been suggested that G. apertus, G. galitopouli, G. guerbuezi, G. major and G. transversus be moved there as well.

References

Rodent genera
Glis
Taxa named by Mathurin Jacques Brisson
Taxa described in 1762